Harald Spörl (born October 31, 1966) is a German former football midfielder. He currently works for Hamburger SV as a scout. From July 1987 to December 2000 Spörl played for Hamburger SV before joining LR Ahlen until June 2002.

References

Honours
 Bundesliga third place: 2000

1966 births
Living people
Sportspeople from Bamberg
Association football midfielders
German footballers
Footballers from Bavaria
Bundesliga players
Hamburger SV players
Rot Weiss Ahlen players